Sid Ahmed Zerrouki (born August 30, 1970) is an Algerian former international football midfielder. He was a member of the Algerian national team that participated in the 1996 Africa Cup of Nations in South Africa.

Honours

Club
 Won the Algerian league with MC Oran in 1993
 Won the Algerian Cup with MC Oran in 1996
 Won the Algerian League Cup with MC Oran in 1996
 Won the Arab Cup Winners Cup twice with MC Oran in 1997 and 1998
 Won the Arab Super Cup once with MC Oran in 1999
 Finalist of the Arab Champions League once with MC Oran in 2001

Country
 Won the silver medal at the 1993 Mediterranean Games in Languedoc-Roussillon

External links
 Sid Ahmed Zerrouki statistics - dzfootball
 DZFoot.com Profile

1970 births
Footballers from Oran
1996 African Cup of Nations players
Algeria international footballers
Algeria under-23 international footballers
Mediterranean Games silver medalists for Algeria
Competitors at the 1991 Mediterranean Games
Competitors at the 1993 Mediterranean Games
Algerian footballers
MC Oran players
CS Sfaxien players
ASM Oran players
OM Arzew players
CR Belouizdad players
Living people
Association football midfielders
Mediterranean Games medalists in football
Algerian expatriate footballers
Expatriate footballers in Tunisia
21st-century Algerian people
20th-century Algerian people